Patricia Pinedo (born 13 May 1981 in Amurrio) is a Spanish handballer who plays for SD Itxako and the Spanish national team, with them she participated at the 2011 World Women's Handball Championship in Brazil.

Her twin sister Elisabeth Pinedo also plays for the Spanish national handball team.

References

1981 births
Living people
Spanish female handball players
Twin sportspeople
Spanish twins
Sportspeople from Álava
Identical twins
Handball players from the Basque Country (autonomous community)